Devenish may refer to:

Places
 Devenish, Victoria, a town in Australia
 Devenish Island, an island in Northern Ireland
 A civil parish in Magheraboy, County Fermanagh, Northern Ireland

People
 Charlie Devenish (1874–1922), South African rugby union player
 Cristian Devenish (born 2001), Colombian footballer
 Desmond Devenish, English-American filmmaker
 Myrtle Devenish (1913–2007), British film actress
 Olivia Mariamne Devenish (1771–1814), British socialite
 Robert Devenish (disambiguation), several people
 Ross Devenish (born 1939), South African film director
 Tiger Devenish (1867–1928), South African rugby union player
 Tony Devenish, English politician

Sport
 Devenish Chase, a horse race in Ireland
 Devenish Football Club, an Australian Rules football club that competed in the Benalla & District Football League

Others
 Devenish Brewery, a brewery in Weymouth, Dorset, England
 Devenish College, a secondary school located in Enniskillen, County Fermanagh, Northern Ireland

See also
Devonish (disambiguation)